Allister Grosart,  (December 13, 1906 – February 8, 1984) was a Progressive Conservative politician, Senator, journalist and businessman in Canada.

Born in Dublin, Ireland, his mother was a missionary and he was raised in China. He received a degree in law from the University of Toronto but became a journalist instead of a lawyer. He worked for the Toronto Daily Star and The Globe and Mail. During World War II, he served with the 2nd battalion of the Irish Regiment reaching the rank of major. After the war, he eventually joined a public relations firm.

Grosart  in which the party defeated the Liberals for the first time since 1930. He was also a key organizer in the subsequent 1958 election in which the Diefenbaker government was returned with the largest majority in Canadian history.

In 1962, Diefenbaker appointed Grosart to the Senate. He served as deputy leader of the Opposition from 1974 until 1979, and became Speaker of the Senate of Canada when the Tories again formed government from 1979 to 1980 under Joe Clark. Grosart retired from the Senate in 1981, and was appointed to the Queen's Privy Council for Canada in honour of his long service.

Archives 
There is an Allister Grosart fonds at Library and Archives Canada.

References

External links 
 
 Speakers of the Senate biography
Allister Grosart fonds at the National Gallery of Canada, Ottawa, Ontario.

1906 births
1984 deaths
Businesspeople from Ontario
Canadian male journalists
Canadian senators from Ontario
Canadian people of Scottish descent
Irish emigrants to Canada
Journalists from Ontario
Members of the King's Privy Council for Canada
Progressive Conservative Party of Canada senators
Speakers of the Senate of Canada
University of Toronto alumni
Politicians from County Dublin